Streptomyces lacticiproducens is a bacterium species from the genus of Streptomyces which has been isolated from the rhizosphere of a tomato plant in Guangzhou in China. Streptomyces lacticiproducens produces lactic acid.

See also 
 List of Streptomyces species

References

Further reading

External links
Type strain of Streptomyces lacticiproducens at BacDive -  the Bacterial Diversity Metadatabase

lacticiproducens
Bacteria described in 2011